The 1953 Texas Tech Red Raiders football team represented Texas Technological College—now known as Texas Tech University—as a member of the Border Conference during the 1953 college football season. Led by third-year head coach DeWitt Weaver, the Red Raiders compiled an overall record of 11–1 with a mark of 5–0 in conference play, winning the Border Conference title. Texas Tech was invited to the Gator Bowl, where they beat the Auburn.

Schedule

References

Texas Tech
Texas Tech Red Raiders football seasons
Border Conference football champion seasons
Gator Bowl champion seasons
Texas Tech Red Raiders football